is a railway station on the Sasshō Line in Tōbetsu, Hokkaidō, Japan, operated by the Hokkaido Railway Company (JR Hokkaido). The station is numbered G13.

The name of the station has been changed from "Ishikari-Tōbetsu" to "Tōbetsu" on 12 March 2022.

Lines

Station layout

The station has one side platform (platform 1) and one island platform (platforms 2/3) serving a total of three tracks on the otherwise single-track section of the line east of Ainosato-Kyōikudai Station. The station has automated ticket machines and Kitaca card readers  and a "Midori no Madoguchi" staffed ticket office.

Platforms

History
The station opened on 20 November 1934.

See also
 List of railway stations in Japan

References

External links

 Station information and map 

Railway stations in Hokkaido Prefecture
Railway stations in Japan opened in 1934
Stations of Hokkaido Railway Company